Aleksandr Dmitrievich Dulichenko (alternatively Alexander Duličenko) (born 1941) is a Russian-Estonian Esperantist, linguist, and an expert in Slavic microlanguages currently living in Estonia. He is a professor at the University of Tartu in Tartu, where he is the head of the department of Slavic studies.

Dulichenko was born in Krasnodar. He is the editor of Interlinguistica Tartuensis, a journal on interlinguistics published by the University of Tartu that published seven volumes from 1982 to 1990 recording the proceedings of colloquia at Tartu; in 2006, an eighth volume was published. 
A festschrift in Dulichenko's honor was organized in 2006; Humphrey Tonkin calls this volume a "particularly important addition to the literature" of interlinguistics and Esperanto studies.

References

1941 births
Living people
People from Krasnodar
Russian Esperantists
Linguists from Russia
Linguists from Estonia
Slavists
Turkmen State University alumni
Academic staff of the University of Tartu
Recipients of the Order of the White Star, 4th Class